The 1998 Team Ice Racing World Championship was the 20th edition of the Team World Championship. The final was held on ?, 1998, in Gothenburg, in Sweden. Russia won the title.

Final Classification

See also 
 1998 Individual Ice Speedway World Championship
 1998 Speedway World Team Cup in classic speedway
 1998 Speedway Grand Prix in classic speedway

References 

Ice speedway competitions
World